Yale was a provincial electoral district in British Columbia, Canada from the province's joining Confederation in 1871.  It was a 3-member constituency and retained the name Yale until the 1894 election, at which time it was split into three ridings, Yale-East, Yale-North and Yale-West; other ridings in the southeast of the province had previously been split off, e.g., Fernie, Ymir, Grand Forks, which were later emerged or rearranged into the various Kootenay and Okanagan ridings.  In 1903 the name Yale (by itself) was revived, this time as a one-member riding only, the new riding largely based upon Yale-West.   Its last appearance on the hustings was 1963.  In 1966, it was amalgamated into the new riding of Yale-Lillooet, which was extant until 2009, when most of its core area was made part of the new Fraser-Nicola riding.

Geography 
The original Yale riding encompassed the whole of today's Kootenay, Okanagan, Similkameen, Thompson and Nicola regions, plus its original core in the Fraser Canyon, south from and including Lytton.  The riding's name is from the town of Yale, British Columbia, then still an important centre in the new province and in fact one of the very few actual towns in the riding at the time.

Notable MLAs 

Charles Augustus Semlin (12th Premier 1915-1928, first elected 1871)
John Andrew Mara
Forbes George Vernon (namesake of the city of Vernon)
Richard McBride (1909, incumbent/16th Premier 1903-1915)
John Duncan MacLean (20th Premier, 1920–1921)
William Leonard Hartley

Notable candidates 

Gilbert Malcolm Sproat, native claims commissioner

Election results 
Note: Winners of each election are in bold.

|-

|Independent
|George Coxon 1
|align="right"|29
|align="right"|16.96%
|align="right"|
|align="right"|unknown

|Independent
|William H. Kay
|align="right"|8
|align="right"|4.68%
|align="right"|
|align="right"|unknown

|Independent
|Moses Lumby
|align="right"|17
|align="right"|9.94%
|align="right"|
|align="right"|unknown

|Independent
|James Robinson
|align="right"|35
|align="right"|20.47%
|align="right"|
|align="right"|unknown

|Independent
|Charles Augustus Semlin
|align="right"|29
|align="right"|16.96%
|align="right"|
|align="right"|unknown

|Independent
|Robert Smith
|align="right"|53
|align="right"|30.99%
|align="right"|
|align="right"|unknown
|- bgcolor="white"
!align="right" colspan=3|Total valid votes
!align="right"|171
!align="right"|100.00%
!align="right"|
!align="right"|
|- bgcolor="white"
!align="right" colspan=3|Total rejected ballots
!align="right"|
!align="right"|
!align="right"|
!align="right"|
|- bgcolor="white"
!align="right" colspan=3|Turnout
!align="right"|%
!align="right"|
!align="right"|
!align="right"|
|- bgcolor="white"
!align="right" colspan=7|1 The Returning Officer cast the deciding vote for Semlin, who had the same number of votes.
|}

|-

|- bgcolor="white"
!align="right" colspan=3|Total valid votes
!align="right"|788
!align="right"|100.00%
!align="right"|
|- bgcolor="white"
!align="right" colspan=3|Total rejected ballots
!align="right"|
!align="right"|
!align="right"|
|- bgcolor="white"
!align="right" colspan=3|Turnout
!align="right"|%
!align="right"|
!align="right"|
|}

|-

|Independent
|Charles Augustus Semlin
|align="right"|254
|align="right"|25.60%
|align="right"|
|align="right"|unknown

|Independent
|Gilbert Malcolm Sproat
|align="right"|68
|align="right"|6.86%
|align="right"|
|align="right"|unknown
|- bgcolor="white"
!align="right" colspan=3|Total valid votes
!align="right"|992
!align="right"|100.00%
!align="right"|
|- bgcolor="white"
!align="right" colspan=3|Total rejected ballots
!align="right"|
!align="right"|
!align="right"|
|- bgcolor="white"
!align="right" colspan=3|Turnout
!align="right"|%
!align="right"|
!align="right"|
|}

|-

|- bgcolor="white"
!align="right" colspan=3|Total valid votes
!align="right"|401
!align="right"|100.00%
!align="right"|
|- bgcolor="white"
!align="right" colspan=3|Total rejected ballots
!align="right"|
!align="right"|
!align="right"|
|- bgcolor="white"
!align="right" colspan=3|Turnout
!align="right"|%
!align="right"|
!align="right"|
|- bgcolor="white"
!align="right" colspan=7|2  Death of Preston Bennett August 9, 1882.
|}

|-

|- bgcolor="white"
!align="right" colspan=3|Total valid votes
!align="right"|1,314
!align="right"|100.00%
!align="right"|
|- bgcolor="white"
!align="right" colspan=3|Total rejected ballots
!align="right"|
!align="right"|
!align="right"|
|- bgcolor="white"
!align="right" colspan=3|Turnout
!align="right"|%
!align="right"|
!align="right"|
|}

|-

|- bgcolor="white"
!align="right" colspan=3|Total valid votes
!align="right"|1,944
!align="right"|100.00%
!align="right"|
|- bgcolor="white"
!align="right" colspan=3|Total rejected ballots
!align="right"|
!align="right"|
!align="right"|
|- bgcolor="white"
!align="right" colspan=3|Turnout
!align="right"|%
!align="right"|
!align="right"|
|}

7th 1894 British Columbia general election

split to three ridings:
Yale-East
Yale-West
Yale-North

8th 1898 British Columbia general election

Yale-East
Yale-West
Yale-North

9th 1900 British Columbia general election

Yale-East
Yale-West
Yale-North

|-

|Liberal
|Stuart Alexander Henderson
|align="right"|309
|align="right"|60.59%
|align="right"|
|align="right"|unknown

|Conservative
|Thomas Gray McManamon
|align="right"|201
|align="right"|39.41%
|align="right"|
|align="right"|unknown
|- bgcolor="white"
!align="right" colspan=3|Total valid votes
!align="right"|510
!align="right"|100.00%
!align="right"|
|- bgcolor="white"
!align="right" colspan=3|Total rejected ballots
!align="right"|
!align="right"|
!align="right"|
|- bgcolor="white"
!align="right" colspan=3|Turnout
!align="right"|%
!align="right"|
!align="right"|
|- bgcolor="white"
!align="right" colspan=6|4Restored seat reduced to one member only; successor to Yale-West
|}

|-

|Liberal
|Stuart Alexander Henderson
|align="right"|289
|align="right"|58.27%
|align="right"|
|align="right"|unknown

|Conservative
|Charles Augustus Semlin 
|align="right"|207
|align="right"|41.73%
|align="right"|
|align="right"|unknown
|- bgcolor="white"
!align="right" colspan=3|Total valid votes
!align="right"|496
!align="right"|100.00%
!align="right"|
|- bgcolor="white"
!align="right" colspan=3|Total rejected ballots
!align="right"|
!align="right"|
!align="right"|
|- bgcolor="white"
!align="right" colspan=3|Turnout
!align="right"|%
!align="right"|
!align="right"|
|}

|-

|Liberal
|Stuart Alexander Henderson
|align="right"|265
|align="right"|36.81%
|align="right"|
|align="right"|unknown

|Conservative
|Richard McBride
|align="right"|455
|align="right"|63.19%
|align="right"|
|align="right"|unknown
|- bgcolor="white"
!align="right" colspan=3|Total valid votes
!align="right"|720
!align="right"|100.00%
!align="right"|
|- bgcolor="white"
!align="right" colspan=3|Total rejected ballots
!align="right"|
!align="right"|
!align="right"|
|- bgcolor="white"
!align="right" colspan=3|Turnout
!align="right"|%
!align="right"|
!align="right"|
|}

|-

|Conservative
|Alexander Lucas
|align="right"|524
|align="right"|65.26%
|align="right"|
|align="right"|unknown

|Liberal
|John P. McConnell
|align="right"|279
|align="right"|34.74%
|align="right"|
|align="right"|unknown
|- bgcolor="white"
!align="right" colspan=3|Total valid votes
!align="right"|281
!align="right"|100.00%
!align="right"|
|- bgcolor="white"
!align="right" colspan=3|Total rejected ballots
!align="right"|
!align="right"|
!align="right"|
|- bgcolor="white"
!align="right" colspan=3|Turnout
!align="right"|71.98%
!align="right"|
!align="right"|
|}

|-

|Conservative
|Alexander Lucas
|align="right"|609
|align="right"|42.95%
|align="right"|
|align="right"|unknown

|Liberal
|Joseph Walters
|align="right"|809
|align="right"|57.05%
|align="right"|
|align="right"|unknown
|- bgcolor="white"
!align="right" colspan=3|Total valid votes
!align="right"|1,418
!align="right"|100.00%
!align="right"|
|- bgcolor="white"
!align="right" colspan=3|Total rejected ballots
!align="right"|
!align="right"|
!align="right"|
|- bgcolor="white"
!align="right" colspan=3|Turnout
!align="right"|%
!align="right"|
!align="right"|
|}

|-

|Liberal
|James Robert Cameron
|align="right"|737
|align="right"|31.95%
|align="right"|
|align="right"|unknown

|Conservative
|John McRae
|align="right"|913
|align="right"|39.58%
|align="right"|
|align="right"|unknown

|- bgcolor="white"
!align="right" colspan=3|Total valid votes
!align="right"|2,307
!align="right"|100.00%
!align="right"|

|Liberal
|John Joseph Alban Gillis
|align="right"|1,514
|align="right"|57.22%
|align="right"|
|align="right"|unknown

|Conservative
|Romald Helmerow Helmer
|align="right"|1,132
|align="right"|42.78%
|align="right"|
|align="right"|unknown
|- bgcolor="white"
!align="right" colspan=3|Total valid votes
!align="right"|2,646
!align="right"|100.00%
!align="right"|
|- bgcolor="white"
!align="right" colspan=3|Total rejected ballots
!align="right"|27
!align="right"|
!align="right"|
|- bgcolor="white"
!align="right" colspan=3|Turnout
!align="right"|%
!align="right"|
!align="right"|
|}

|-

|Liberal
|John Joseph Alban Gillis
|align="right"|1,193
|align="right"|68.64%
|align="right"|
|align="right"|unknown

|Co-operative Commonwealth Fed.
|John Wise Langley
|align="right"|233
|align="right"|13.41%
|align="right"|
|align="right"|unknown
|- bgcolor="white"
!align="right" colspan=3|Total valid votes
!align="right"|1,738
!align="right"|100.00%
!align="right"|
|- bgcolor="white"
!align="right" colspan=3|Total rejected ballots
!align="right"|23
!align="right"|
!align="right"|
|- bgcolor="white"
!align="right" colspan=3|Turnout
!align="right"|%
!align="right"|
!align="right"|
|}

|-

|Liberal
|John Joseph Alban Gillis
|align="right"|968
|align="right"|59.94%
|align="right"|
|align="right"|unknown

|Co-operative Commonwealth Fed.
|John Wise Langley
|align="right"|422
|align="right"|26.13%
|align="right"|
|align="right"|unknown

|Conservative
|John Wilson North
|align="right"|225
|align="right"|13.93%
|align="right"|
|align="right"|unknown
|- bgcolor="white"
!align="right" colspan=3|Total valid votes
!align="right"|1,615
!align="right"|100.00%
!align="right"|
|- bgcolor="white"
!align="right" colspan=3|Total rejected ballots
!align="right"|40
!align="right"|
!align="right"|
|- bgcolor="white"
!align="right" colspan=3|Turnout
!align="right"|%
!align="right"|
!align="right"|
|}

|-

|Conservative
|Alexander Rennie Ross Craig
|align="right"|616
|align="right"|34.92%
|align="right"|
|align="right"|unknown

|Liberal
|John Joseph Alban Gillis
|align="right"|1,148
|align="right"|65.08%
|align="right"|
|align="right"|unknown
|- bgcolor="white"
!align="right" colspan=3|Total valid votes
!align="right"|1,764
!align="right"|100.00%
!align="right"|
|- bgcolor="white"
!align="right" colspan=3|Total rejected ballots
!align="right"|55
!align="right"|
!align="right"|
|- bgcolor="white"
!align="right" colspan=3|Turnout
!align="right"|%
!align="right"|
!align="right"|
|}

|-

|Liberal
|John Joseph Alban Gillis
|align="right"|1077
|align="right"|34.92%
|align="right"|
|align="right"|unknown

|Co-operative Commonwealth Fed.
|Angus Hugh MacIsaac
|align="right"|536
|align="right"|33.23%
|align="right"|
|align="right"|unknown
|- bgcolor="white"
!align="right" colspan=3|Total valid votes
!align="right"|1,613
!align="right"|100.00%
!align="right"|
|- bgcolor="white"
!align="right" colspan=3|Total rejected ballots
!align="right"|63
!align="right"|
!align="right"|
|- bgcolor="white"
!align="right" colspan=3|Turnout
!align="right"|%
!align="right"|
!align="right"|
|}

|-

|Co-operative Commonwealth Fed.
|Angus Hugh MacIsaac
|align="right"|865
|align="right"|28.83%
|align="right"|
|align="right"|unknown

|Independent
|William John Trout
|align="right"|728
|align="right"|24.27%
|align="right"|
|align="right"|unknown
|- bgcolor="white"
!align="right" colspan=3|Total valid votes
!align="right"|3,000
!align="right"|100.00%
!align="right"|
|- bgcolor="white"
!align="right" colspan=3|Total rejected ballots
!align="right"|42
!align="right"|
!align="right"|
|- bgcolor="white"
!align="right" colspan=3|Turnout
!align="right"|%
!align="right"|
!align="right"|
|}

|-

|Progressive Conservative
|Bernard (Ben) Cherry
|align="right"|338 	 	
|align="right"|10.74%
|align="right"|- 	  
|align="right"|-%
|align="right"|
|align="right"|unknown

|Liberal
|John Joseph Allan Gillis
|align="right"|1,067 	   
|align="right"|33.89%  
|align="right"|1,311 	 
|align="right"|48.54% 
|align="right"|
|align="right"|unknown

|Co-operative Commonwealth Fed.
|Angus Hugh MacIsaac
|align="right"|659 	 	 	      
|align="right"|20.93% 
|align="right"|-  
|align="right"| -% 
|align="right"|
|align="right"|unknown

|Independent
|George Murray
|align="right"|60 	   
|align="right"|1.91% 
|align="right"|-
|align="right"|-% 
|align="right"|
|align="right"|unknown
|- bgcolor="white"
!align="right" colspan=3|Total valid votes
!align="right"|3,148 	  	      
!align="right"|%
!align="right"|2,701
!align="right"|100.00%
!align="right"|
|- bgcolor="white"
!align="right" colspan=3|Total rejected ballots
!align="right"|98
!align="right"|
!align="right"|
|- bgcolor="white"
!align="right" colspan=3|Turnout
!align="right"|%
!align="right"|
!align="right"|
|- bgcolor="white"
!align="right" colspan=9|2 Preferential ballot - final count is between top two candidates from earlier counts; intermediary counts (of 4) not shown.
|}

|Co-operative Commonwealth Federation
|Evan Donald MacDougall	 	 	
|align="right"|835 	 	  
|align="right"|28.28% 
|align="right"|- 	
|align="right"| - %
|align="right"|
|align="right"|unknown
|- bgcolor="white"
!align="right" colspan=3|Total valid votes
!align="right"|2,953 	  		
!align="right"|100.00%
!align="right"|2,491  
!align="right"|%
!align="right"|
|- bgcolor="white"
!align="right" colspan=3|Total rejected ballots
!align="right"|278
!align="right"|
!align="right"|
!align="right"|
!align="right"|
|- bgcolor="white"
!align="right" colspan=3|Total Registered Voters
!align="right"|5,933 (1952 list)
!align="right"|
!align="right"|
!align="right"|
!align="right"|
|- bgcolor="white"
!align="right" colspan=3|Turnout
!align="right"|70.15%
!align="right"|
!align="right"|
!align="right"|
!align="right"|
|- bgcolor="white"
!align="right" colspan=9|3  Preferential ballot; final count is between top two candidates from first count; intermediary counts (of 3) not shown
|}

|-

|Co-operative Commonwealth Fed.
|Joe Madden
|align="right"|599
|align="right"|21.56%
|align="right"|
|align="right"|unknown

|Liberal
|Olga McLean
|align="right"|703
|align="right"|25.31%
|align="right"|
|align="right"|unknown

|Conservative
|Kenneth Moyes
|align="right"|161
|align="right"|5.80%
|align="right"|
|align="right"|unknown
|- bgcolor="white"
!align="right" colspan=3|Total valid votes
!align="right"|2,778
!align="right"|100.00%
!align="right"|
|- bgcolor="white"
!align="right" colspan=3|Total rejected ballots
!align="right"|61
!align="right"|
!align="right"|
|- bgcolor="white"
!align="right" colspan=3|Turnout
!align="right"|%
!align="right"|
!align="right"|
|}

|-

|Liberal
|John Allan Collett
|align="right"|964
|align="right"|27.30%
|align="right"|
|align="right"|unknown

|Conservative
|William Joseph Lauder
|align="right"|390
|align="right"|11.05%
|align="right"|
|align="right"|unknown

|Co-operative Commonwealth Fed.
|Evan Donald MacDougall
|align="right"|1,074
|align="right"|30.42%
|align="right"|
|align="right"|unknown
|- bgcolor="white"
!align="right" colspan=3|Total valid votes
!align="right"|3,531
!align="right"|100.00%
!align="right"|
|- bgcolor="white"
!align="right" colspan=3|Total rejected ballots
!align="right"|107
!align="right"|
!align="right"|
|- bgcolor="white"
!align="right" colspan=3|Turnout
!align="right"|%
!align="right"|
!align="right"|
|}

|-

|Liberal
|John Allan Collett
|align="right"|599
|align="right"|13.10%
|align="right"|
|align="right"|unknown

|Conservative
|John Willison Green
|align="right"|584
|align="right"|12.78%
|align="right"|
|align="right"|unknown

|New Democrat
|William Leonard Hartley
|align="right"|1,697
|align="right"|37.43%
|align="right"|
|align="right"|unknown
|- bgcolor="white"
!align="right" colspan=3|Total valid votes
!align="right"|4,571
!align="right"|100.00%
!align="right"|
|- bgcolor="white"
!align="right" colspan=3|Total rejected ballots
!align="right"|58
!align="right"|
!align="right"|
|- bgcolor="white"
!align="right" colspan=3|Turnout
!align="right"|%
!align="right"|
!align="right"|
|}

Before the 28th general election in 1966, parts of the former riding of Yale became incorporated into the new riding of Yale-Lillooet, which survives to the present.

References

External links

Elections BC website - historical election data

Former provincial electoral districts of British Columbia